Fleeting Days is a 2003 folk rock album by Dan Bern and the International Jewish Banking Conspiracy. While much of Bern's music is heavily influenced by Bob Dylan, Fleeting Days is also influenced by the style of Elvis Costello and Bruce Springsteen. Its songs are more modest and toned down compared to earlier albums, but Dan Bern's quirky lyrics and imagery remain.

Track listing
"Baby Bye Bye" – 3:06
"Eva" – 3:46
"Superman" – 3:58
"Closer to You" – 7:00
"I Need You" – 4:16
"Chain Around My Neck" – 2:32
"Jane" – 2:36
"Crow" – 2:31
"Don't Make Me Leave" – 3:43
"City" – 3:38
"Fly Away" – 6:46
"Graceland" – 5:00
"Soul" – 4:25

References

2003 albums
Dan Bern albums
Messenger Records albums